Beverly Bennett Dobbs (1868–1937) was a photographer and filmmaker in the Pacific Northwest and Alaska. The University of Washington has his work in their collection. He was born near Marshall, Missouri. He moved with his family to Lincoln, Nebraska when he was eight.  In 1888, Dobbs moved to Bellingham, Washington and partnered with F. F. Fleming at Dobbs & Fleming between 1890–1891. Dobbs had a photography studio in Bellingham for 12 years until 1900 when he moved to Nome, Alaska. He took a small schooner from Seattle to try and film the emergence of islands in the Bogoslof group. In Nome he photographed the town, the Seward Peninsula, and Inuit. He also reportedly prospected for gold. He partnered with A. B. Kinne to form Dobbs & Kinne in Nome.

Achievements 

In 1909, he established the Dobbs Alaska Moving Picture Co. and made films about the Gold Rush including travelogues. He also photographed the Alaska Yukon Pacific Exposition taking place in Seattle that year. By 1911, he his shifted his focus to filmmaking, selling off his negatives to Lomen Brothers. He moved back to Seattle by 1914. He ran the Dobbs Totem Film Company until his death in 1937. His work includes photographs of fish processing operations at Pacific American Fisheries (PAF) in the Fairhaven, Washington area of Bellingham. He was awarded a gold medal at the Louisiana Purchase Exposition (St. Louis World’s Fair) in 1904 for his "Eskimo" photographs.

Personal life 
In 1896 Dobbs married Dorothy Sturgeon in Bellingham.

Filmography 
At the Top of the World, Atop of the World in Motion, also known as Top of the World in Motion, a collection of his travelogue films
A Romance of Seattle shot in and around Seattle in 1919

References 

1868 births
1937 deaths
People from Marshall, Missouri
People from Lincoln, Nebraska
People from Nome, Alaska
People from Bellingham, Washington
19th-century American photographers
20th-century American photographers
Photographers from Missouri
Photographers from Washington (state)
Photographers from Nebraska
Photographers from Alaska